The San Francisco Docks is a 1940 American crime drama film directed by Arthur Lubin and starring Burgess Meredith, Barry Fitzgerald, and Irene Hervey.

Plot
When his sweetheart, barmaid Kitty Tracy, is annoyed by a customer, longshoreman Johnny Barnes slugs the guy. The man is later found dead. Johnny is tried for murder and convicted.

Kitty and a priest, Father Cameron, believe in Johnny's innocence and search for a way to exonerate him. They discover that Monte March, a prisoner who has escaped Alcatraz prison, is the real killer, being helped by wife Frances in fleeing from the law. March is apprehended and Johnny's set free.

The movie is noteworthy in that featured a fight scene between two of the actresses, Esther Ralston and Irene Hervey. Both women told director Arthur Lubin that they did not want to have stunt doubles perform the fight scene, described by press accounts as a "... whirlwind fistfight... said to overshadow the most hectic feminine movie battles seen in recent motion pictures." Hervey later described the fight as a "...terrific battle between me and Esther Ralston—with hair-pulling, kicking, the works."

Cast
 Burgess Meredith as Johnny Barnes
 Irene Hervey as Kitty Tracy
 Barry Fitzgerald as Icky
 Robert Armstrong as Father Cameron
 Raymond Walburn as Admiral Andy
 Esther Ralston as Frances
 Edward Pawley as Monte March

Production
In May 1940 Universal announced the film as part of its schedule for the following year. On September 20 the studio said Meredith would star alongside Irene Harvey and Barry Fitzgerald, with Arthur Lubin to direct. The film was shot in eleven days.

Reception
The New York Times called it "routine... a lot of melodramatic foolishness."

References

External links
The San Francisco Docks at IMDb
The San Francisco Docks at TCMDB
San Francisco Docks at BFI

1940 films
Films set in San Francisco
1940 crime drama films
American crime drama films
Films directed by Arthur Lubin
American black-and-white films
1940s English-language films
1940s American films